Herbert Meier (29 August 1928 – 21 September 2018) was a Swiss writer and translator.

Meier studied literature, history of art and philosophy at the universities of Basel, Vienna, Paris and Fribourg.

Since 1955, Meier has been a freelance writer in Zurich. He won the Conrad-Ferdinand-Meyer-Preis in 1964. The main component of his work has been translating classical and modern theatre plays from French into German (authors such as Paul Claudel and Georges Schehadé).

References 

 Biography at felix-bloch-erben.de 

1928 births
2018 deaths
People from the canton of Solothurn
University of Basel alumni
University of Vienna alumni
University of Paris alumni
University of Fribourg alumni
Swiss writers
Swiss translators
French–German translators
20th-century translators